Newcastle High School or Newcastle School is a public high school located in Newcastle, Texas (USA) and classified as a 1A school by the UIL. It is part of the Newcastle Independent School District located in central Young County. In 2015, the school was rated "Met Standard" by the Texas Education Agency.

Athletics
The Newcastle Bobcats compete in these sports - 

Basketball
Cross Country
6-Man Football
Golf
Tennis
Track and Field
Volleyball

State Finalist

Football  - 
1951(1A)

See also
List of Six-man football stadiums in Texas

References

External links
Newcastle ISD

Public high schools in Texas
Schools in Young County, Texas